Onychodiaptomus is a genus of copepods in the family Diaptomidae, containing the following species:
Onychodiaptomus birgei (Marsh, 1894)
Onychodiaptomus hesperus M. S. Wilson & Light, 1951
Onychodiaptomus louisianensis M. S. Wilson & W. G. Moore, 1953
Onychodiaptomus sanguineus (S. A. Forbes, 1876)
Onychodiaptomus virginiensis (Marsh, 1915)
Onychodiaptomus louisianensis, a species endemic to the United States, is listed as Data Deficient on the IUCN Red List.

References

Diaptomidae
Taxonomy articles created by Polbot